Roger Dorsinville (March 11, 1911 - January 12, 1992) was a Haitian poet, journalist, novelist, politician, and diplomat. Born in Port-au-Prince, Dorsinville attended military school before serving as the Minister of Public Health and ambassador to Venezuela. Some of his most notable works are Barrières (1946), Pour Célébrer la Terre (1954), Le Grand Devoir (1962), and Toussaint Louverture (1965).

Selected works

Novels 
Kimby, ou, La loi de Niang, 1973
L'Afrique des rois, 1975
Un Homme en trois morceaux, 1975
Mourir pour Haïti, ou, Les croisés d'Esther, 1980
Renaître à Dendé, 1980. 
De Fatras Bâton à Toussaint Louverture, 1983
Marche arrière (Mémoires), 1986 
Accords perdus, 1987
Ils ont tué le vieux blanc, 1988
Une Haïtienne à New York, 1991
Les Vèvès du Créateur, 1989
Rites de passage (complete works, 11 volumes), 1990
Marche arrière II (Mémoires), 1991

References

External links
Emerging from the Shadow of the Father: Memoirs of Haiti
Roger Dorsinville Biography (in French)

1911 births
1992 deaths
Haitian male novelists
Haitian male poets
People from Port-au-Prince
Ambassadors of Haiti to Venezuela
Government ministers of Haiti
20th-century Haitian novelists
20th-century Haitian poets
20th-century male writers